The 2014 NBA Finals was the championship series of the National Basketball Association's (NBA) 2013–14 season and the conclusion of the season's playoffs, played from June 5 to June 15, 2014. It was contested between two-time defending NBA champion and Eastern Conference champion Miami Heat and the Western Conference champion San Antonio Spurs. In a rematch, the Spurs defeated the Heat 4–1 for their 5th title overall. Kawhi Leonard was named the Finals Most Valuable Player (MVP), receiving 10 out of 11 votes.

The series serves a rematch from the previous NBA season, the 12th in Finals history, but only the fifth since the ABA–NBA merger in 1976. This was the first NBA Finals since 1984 to use the 2–2–1–1–1 format after the Board of Governors agreed to change the format from 2–3–2, which was used from 1985 to 2013.

Background

Miami Heat

Led by their Big Three of LeBron James, Dwyane Wade, and Chris Bosh, the Miami Heat made their fourth straight appearance in the NBA Finals, following two back-to-back wins in the 2012 and 2013 playoffs.

They were the first team since the 1987 Boston Celtics to make it to four straight NBA Finals, and only the fourth team in NBA history to achieve that goal, besides the 1966 Boston Celtics (as a matter of fact, ten straight appearances), 1985 Los Angeles Lakers and the 1986-87 Boston Celtics. From 2015 to 2018 the Cleveland Cavaliers led by LeBron James also achieved the same feat. They were seeking to become the first NBA team to three-peat since the 2002 Los Angeles Lakers. Heading into the postseason, the Heat had an 11–14 record in the last 25 games. In the first round, they eliminated the Charlotte Bobcats and won 4–0. In the Conference Semifinals, they eliminated the Brooklyn Nets and won 4–1, despite being swept by Brooklyn in the regular season. In the Eastern Conference Finals, they again played the Indiana Pacers in a rematch of the previous year's Conference Finals. Miami won the series 4–2, eliminating the Indiana Pacers from the playoffs for the third straight year.

San Antonio Spurs

The Spurs had a deep roster, with no player averaging 30 minutes during the regular season. Their offense relied on ball movement, being called "one of the most beautiful-to-watch teams in the NBA" by USA Today.

This was the San Antonio Spurs's sixth appearance in the NBA Finals, and they headed to the postseason with the best record in the NBA and a franchise record 19-game winning streak, ending with a 22–4 run in their last 26 games. In the first round, they faced their Texas rivals, the Dallas Mavericks, who surprised the Spurs by taking the series to seven games despite the Spurs sweeping the Mavericks in the regular season for 2 consecutive years. San Antonio won 4–3. In the Conference Semifinals, they eliminated the Portland Trail Blazers and won 4–1. In their third consecutive Conference Finals, they eliminated the Oklahoma City Thunder and won the series 4–2, despite being swept by Oklahoma City in the regular season, and for the first time, they qualified for back-to-back Finals appearances.

Road to the Finals

Regular season series
The regular season series was split 1–1, with each team winning at home:

Series summary

Game summaries
All times are in Eastern Daylight Time (UTC−4)
The Spurs rebounded from their seven-game loss to the Heat in the 2013 Finals to win the series, 4–1, for the franchise's fifth NBA championship. After winning their first four over nine seasons, this was their first since 2007. They defeated Miami by margins of at least 15 points in each of their four wins and also outscored them by an average of 14.0 points per game in the series, which was the largest differential in Finals history at the time. The Spurs finished the playoffs with 12 wins by 15 points or more, the most ever in the postseason. Miami had won 11 straight playoffs series, which was the fifth longest in league history.

The Spurs' Kawhi Leonard was named the Finals MVP after leading the team in scoring in each of the final three games, averaging 23.7 points and shooting 68.5 percent, after scoring just nine in each of the first two games Overall, he averaged 17.8 points on 61.2 percent shooting in the series, the highest field goal percentage of any Finals MVP, and shot 65 percent when guarded by LeBron James in the series. Leonard also led the team with a 57.9 three-point field goal percentage. Leonard was the third-youngest recipient of the award (22 years and 351 days old) since its inception in 1969, and the youngest since Magic Johnson in 1982.

Tim Duncan of the Spurs led all players in the series with 50 rebounds. He was followed by teammate Boris Diaw (43), who was inserted into the starting lineup beginning in Game 3. Diaw led all players in the series in assists (29).

Game 1

Tim Duncan scored 21 points and had 10 rebounds to lead the Spurs to a 110–95 win in Game 1. The game featured the AT&T Center's malfunctioning air-conditioning system, which caused temperatures in the arena to exceed  in the second half. The conditions caused Miami's LeBron James to dehydrate and experience cramps, limiting him to just five minutes of playing time in the fourth quarter. With James on the bench, San Antonio went on a 16–3 run in the game's final four minutes, and outscored the Heat 36–17 in the fourth quarter.

James, who also had cramps in the finals two years earlier, finished the game with 25 points while playing only 33 minutes. Manu Ginóbili had 16 points and 11 assists and Tony Parker contributed 19 points and eight assists for the Spurs, who shot 59 percent for the game despite committing 23 turnovers.

The Spurs shot 14/16 in the 4th quarter. The Spurs' 87.5% conversion rating in the 4th quarter was the most efficient field goal conversion rating for any team in any quarter in NBA Finals history.

Game 2

James rebounded from cramps in Game 1 with 35 points and 10 rebounds to lead Miami to a 98–96 win to tie the series. Bosh made the go-ahead three-point field goal on a pass from James with 1:18 remaining in the game, as the Heat won their 13th straight following a postseason loss. Temperatures in the AT&T Center were comfortable for the game after a broken circuit breaker was repaired following Game 1.

After enduring criticism for not finishing the previous game, James started slowly in the first quarter, shooting 1-for-4 with three turnovers. Meanwhile, the Spurs began the game making 10 of their first 15 shots. James then made 11 of his next 13, and finished 14-for-22 while played a game-high 37 minutes. He had 11 points in the second quarter, when the Heat overcome an early 11-point deficit. The score remained close through the remainder of the game. The Spurs held a two-point lead with 6:43 remaining in the fourth quarter, when Miami's Mario Chalmers elbowed Parker in the midsection for a flagrant foul. Tony Parker and Tim Duncan then combined to miss four straight free throws. He also made a key strip of Parker late in the game.

Bosh finished with 18 points, and Wade and Rashard Lewis added 14 for Miami. Parker had 21 points and Duncan scored 18 points with 15 rebounds for the Spurs, who had won eight consecutive home games by at least 15 points. Parker passed Michael Jordan for eighth place on the NBA's all-time playoff assist list.

Game 3

The Spurs took a 2–1 lead in the series after a career-high 29 points from Leonard and a Finals-record 75.8% shooting effort from the team during the first half. Leonard, limited to only 18 points in the first two games, made his first six shots and was 10-of-13 for the game. San Antonio led by as many as 25 and were comfortably ahead most of the game, including 71–50 at the half. The 21-point margin was the largest halftime lead in the Finals by a road team since Game 3 in 1996 by the Chicago Bulls against the Seattle SuperSonics. The Heat scored 10-straight points in the third quarter to bring the score to 81–74, the closest they would get to the Spurs the rest of the game.

San Antonio's insertion of Boris Diaw into the starting lineup created more ball movement, as the Spurs achieved the first 70-point first half in the Finals since the Los Angeles Lakers' 75 from Game 2 in 1987 against the Boston Celtics. The Heat, who had been 8–0 at home in the playoffs, were led by James and Wade with 22 points apiece. Miami's 20 turnovers were their playoff-high, with James committing his Finals career-high of 7.

Game 4

Leonard had 20 points and 14 rebounds in another rout of the Heat, as the Spurs won 107–86 to take a 3–1 lead in the series; no team had ever come back from a 3–1 deficit in the Finals until two years later. San Antonio again built a large lead on the road before halftime, taking a 55–33 lead in the second quarter after scoring seven consecutive points, culminated by a soaring dunk by Leonard. The Spurs defense held Miami to just 35 percent shooting in the first half after allowing the Heat to shoot 50 percent overall in the prior game. The Heat had followed their prior 13 playoff losses with a win.

The Heat struggled to defend the Spurs' crisp ball movement, orchestrated by Diaw and his game-high nine assists. San Antonio made 57 percent of its field goals, with Parker scoring 19 points, and Duncan adding 10 points and 11 rebounds to surpass Magic Johnson for the most double-doubles in NBA Playoffs history (158). Duncan also eclipsed Kareem Abdul-Jabbar's previous mark (8,851) for most postseason minutes played. Miami was led by James, who had 28 points and eight rebounds, but their other starters combined for only 28 points on 32 percent shooting. Wade made only 1 of 10 from the field through three quarters, finishing with 10 points.

Game 5

The Spurs won 104–87 to win the championship in five games and avenge last season's loss to the Heat in seven games. Leonard had 22 points and 10 rebounds for the Spurs, and was named the Finals MVP. James had 17 first-quarter points for the Heat, who got off to a fast start in building an early 22–6 lead. San Antonio bounced back to outscore Miami 37–13 from the beginning of the second quarter through the middle of the third.

Ginóbili had 19 points and four assists, and Patty Mills scored 17 points off the bench for the Spurs. James finished with 31 points and 10 rebounds, while Bosh had 13 points and Wade added 13 but shot only 4-for-12 from the field.

Rosters

San Antonio Spurs

Miami Heat

Player statistics

San Antonio Spurs

|-
| align="left" |  || 3 || 0 || 2.2 || 1.000 || .000 || .750 || 0.7 || 0.3 || 0.0 || 0.0 || 1.7
|-
| align="left" |  || 3 || 0 || 2.1 || 1.000 || .000 || 1.000 || 0.7 || 0.0 || 0.0 || 0.0 || 2.0
|-
| align="left" |  || 5 || 0 || 11.8 || .471 || .444 || .750 || 1.2 || 0.6 || 0.2 || 0.0 || 4.6
|-
| align="left" |  || 4 || 0 || 6.7 || 1.000 || .000 || .750 || 0.8 || 1.3 || 0.3 || 0.0 || 1.3
|-
| align="left" |  || 5 || 3 || 35.2 || .364 || .333 || .500 || 8.6 || 5.8 || 0.8 || 0.2 || 6.2
|-
| align="left" |  || 5 || 5 || 33.1 || .569 || .000 || .679 || 10.0 || 2.0 || 0.4 || 0.8 || 15.4
|-
| align="left" |  || 5 || 0 || 28.7 || .500 || .417 || .875 || 3.0 || 4.4 || 1.0 || 0.2 || 14.4
|-
| align="left" |  || 5 || 5 || 21.1 || .531 || .450 || .750 || 2.0 || 1.2 || 2.0 || 0.4 || 9.2
|-! style="background:#FDE910;"
| align="left" |  || 5 || 5 || 33.4 || .612 || .579 || .783 || 6.4 || 2.0 || 1.6 || 1.2 || 17.8
|-
| align="left" |  || 5 || 0 || 15.2 || .543 || .565 || .000 || 1.4 || 1.6 || 0.4 || 0.0 || 10.2
|-
| align="left" |  || 3 || 0 || 2.5 || .333 || .000 || .000 || 0.0 || 0.0 || 0.0 || 0.0 || 0.7
|-
| align="left" |  || 5 || 5 || 35.2 || .479 || .417 || .750 || 0.4 || 4.6 || 0.8 || 0.0 || 18.0
|-
| align="left" |  || 5 || 2 || 16.8 || .706 || .000 || .778 || 3.4 || 2.0 || 0.6 || 0.6 || 6.2

Miami Heat

|-
| align="left" |  || 5 || 1 || 31.0 || .415 || .409 || .857 || 3.0 || 1.8 || 1.6 || 0.2 || 9.8
|-
| align="left" |  || 5 || 0 || 17.9 || .250 || .000 || .700 || 5.6 || 0.0 || 0.4 || 0.6 || 2.6
|-
| align="left" |  || 4 || 0 || 8.2 || .000 || .000 || .000 || 0.3 || 0.3 || 0.3 || 0.0 || 0.0
|-
| align="left" |  || 1 || 0 || 17.0 || .571 || .000 || .333 || 3.0 || 1.0 || 0.0 || 0.0 || 9.0
|-
| align="left" |  || 5 || 5 || 36.3 || .549 || .385 || .818 || 5.2 || 1.0 || 0.8 || 0.2 || 14.0
|-
| align="left" |  || 5 || 4 || 23.1 || .333 || .143 || .778 || 1.4 || 2.8 || 1.0 || 0.2 || 4.4
|-
| align="left" |  || 5 || 0 || 16.7 || .316 || .143 || .750 || 1.2 || 1.8 || 0.4 || 0.0 || 3.2
|-
| align="left" |  || 3 || 0 || 3.4 || .250 || .250 || .500 || 1.0 || 0.7 || 0.0 || 0.0 || 1.3
|-
| align="left" |  || 4 || 0 || 5.6 || .400 || .000 || .000 || 1.0 || 0.0 || 0.0 || 0.3 || 1.0
|-
| align="left" |  || 5 || 5 || 37.8 || .571 || .519 || .793 || 7.8 || 4.0 || 2.0 || 0.4 || 28.2
|-
| align="left" |  || 4 || 0 || 3.4 || .571 || .500 || .000 || 0.5 || 0.0 || 0.0 || 0.0 || 2.8
|-
| align="left" |  || 5 || 5 || 22.9 || .500 || .455 || .500 || 1.6 || 0.4 || 0.0 || 0.4 || 8.6
|-
| align="left" |  || 2 || 0 || 1.5 || .000 || .000 || .000 || 0.0 || 0.0 || 0.0 || 0.0 || 0.0
|-
| align="left" |  || 5 || 5 || 34.5 || .438 || .333 || .692 || 3.8 || 2.6 || 1.6 || 0.0 || 15.2

Broadcast
In the United States, the NBA Finals aired on ABC with Mike Breen as play-by-play commentator. ESPN Radio aired it as well and had Kevin Calabro and Hubie Brown as commentators.

Notes

References

External links

National Basketball Association Finals
Finals
NBA Finals
NBA Finals
2010s in Miami
21st century in San Antonio
NBA
NBA
NBA Finals
Basketball competitions in San Antonio
Sports competitions in Miami
ABS-CBN television specials